Le Juge Fayard dit Le Shériff is a 1977 French crime film written and directed by Yves Boisset. The film was inspired by the death of François Renaud.

Cast 
 Patrick Dewaere as le juge Fayard 
 Aurore Clément as Michèle Louvier 
 Philippe Léotard as l'inspecteur Marec 
 Michel Auclair as Simon Pradal, le Docteur 
 Jean Bouise as le procureur général Arnould 
 Daniel Ivernel as Marcheron 
 Jean-Marc Bory as Monsieur Paul, alias Lucien Degueldre
 Marcel Bozzuffi as Joanno

References

External links 

1977 crime drama films
1977 films
Films directed by Yves Boisset
1970s French-language films
French crime drama films
Louis Delluc Prize winners
Films about organized crime in France
Films scored by Philippe Sarde
Crime films based on actual events
Films à clef
Films about murder
1970s French films